Glorifying Terrorism is a 2007 science fiction anthology edited by Farah Mendlesohn, which was compiled in direct response to the Terrorism Act 2006.  Every story in the anthology has been specifically designed to be illegal under the Act's prohibition on any publication "indirectly encouraging the commission or preparation of acts of terrorism," including "every statement which glorifies the commission or preparation (whether in the past, in the future or generally) of such acts," and the anthology's introduction begins with the explicit statement that "(t)he purpose of the stories and poems in this book is to glorify terrorism."

Critical response
The Morning Star offers the anthology a "rousing cheer", declaring its contributors to be "top-notch" and stating that it has "too many highlights to list"; it also states that the authors will not be prosecuted, because they are "too respectable and, mostly, too white".

Contributors

Kathryn Allen
Chaz Brenchley
Marie Brennan
Hal Duncan
Suzette Haden Elgin 
Kira Franz
Van Aaron Hughes
Davin Ireland
Gwyneth Jones
Vylar Kaftan
Lucy Kemnitzer
H. H. Løyche
Ken MacLeod
Una McCormack
Adam Roberts
Elizabeth Sourbut
Katherine Sparrow
Kari Sperring
Charlie Stross
Rachel Swirsky
Lavie Tidhar
James Trimarco
Jo Walton
Ian Watson
Ian Whates

References

External links

2007 Panel discussion with Farah Mendlesohn, Ken Macleod, and Charlie Stross at archive.org
2007 Panel discussion with Farah Mendlesohn on CBC Radio's The Current (requires RealAudio)

Novels about terrorism
Science fiction anthologies
Terrorism laws